Digby Regional High School (DRHS) is a secondary school located in Digby, Nova Scotia. DRHS is part of the Tri-County Regional School Board and is the only high school in the town of Digby. The new high school was opened in 2001.

Administration 
Adam Aldred - Principal
Bobby Morgan - Vice Principal
Jennifer Thibault - Vice Principal

External links
DRHS
Tri-County Regional School Board

High schools in Nova Scotia
Schools in Digby County, Nova Scotia